Welt, welts or variants may refer to:

Media 
 Die Welt (The World), a German national newspaper
 Welt am Sonntag (World on Sunday), the Sunday edition of Die Welt
 Die Welt, former weekly newspaper in Vienna, Austria
 Welt (TV channel), a German television news channel and website
 WELT-LP, a low-power community radio station in Fort Wayne, Indiana
 The Welts, a 2004 Polish film directed by Magdalena Piekorz

Music 
 Welt (band), a punk rock band from Orange County, California
 Welt (album), an album by ohGr
 "Welt", a 2007 song from AM Conspiracy's album Out of the Shallow End
 "Welt", a 2017 song by Chelsea Wolfe from Hiss Spun

Other uses 
 Welt, a term in Heidegger's philosophy
 Welt (bruise), a skin lesion
 Welt, Germany, a village in Schleswig-Holstein, Germany
 Welt (shoe), a part of a shoe